This is a summary of 1967 in music in the United Kingdom.

Events
7 January – The Daily Mail newspaper reports 4,000 potholes in Blackburn, Lancashire; this article, along with a follow-up article on the death of Guinness heir Tara Brown in a car accident, inspires lyrics for The Beatles song "A Day in the Life".
15 January – The Rolling Stones appear on The Ed Sullivan Show in the United States. At Ed Sullivan's  request, the band change the lyrics of "Let's Spend the Night Together" to "Let's spend some time together".
30 January – The Beatles shoot a promotional film for their forthcoming single "Strawberry Fields Forever" at Knole Park in Sevenoaks.
3 February – UK record producer Joe Meek murders his landlady and then commits suicide by shooting himself in the head at Holloway, North London.
7 February – Micky Dolenz of the Monkees meets Paul McCartney at his home in St John's Wood, London, and they pose together for the press. His impressions of the visit feature in the lyrics of "Randy Scouse Git".
10 February – Abbey Road Studio 2 session with Michael Nesmith in attendance as The Beatles record "A Day in the Life" with the London Philharmonic Orchestra performing an "orgasm of noise" featured twice in the song.
12 February – British police raid 'Redlands', the Sussex home of Keith Richards in the early hours of the morning following a tip-off about a party from the News of the World; although no arrests are made at the time, Richards, Mick Jagger and art dealer Robert Fraser are subsequently charged with possession of drugs.
14 February – Aretha Franklin records "Respect" at the New York based Atlantic Studios.
24 February – The Bee Gees sign a management contract with Robert Stigwood.
1 March – Inaugural concert of the Queen Elizabeth Hall, which includes the premieres of Arthur Bliss's River Music, and Benjamin Britten's Hankin Booby, later to be incorporated in his Suite on English Folk Tunes.
3 March – Eric Burdon & The Animals refuse to perform a show in Ottawa, Ontario, unless they are paid in advance. The audience of 3000 riots, causing $5000 in damages to the auditorium.
4 March– The Monkees release their latest single, "Randy Scouse Git", inspired by Micky Dolenz's recent visit to London. Having seen Till Death Us Do Part on TV while there, he uses the term "Randy Scouse Git" from the programme for the title of the single, not realising it is an offensive term. British censors force the title to be changed to "Alternate Title" in the UK, where it reaches #2 in the chart (#1 in the Melody Maker chart).
11 March – A taped appearance by The Beatles on American Bandstand includes their new music video for the songs "Penny Lane" and "Strawberry Fields Forever"
25 March – The Who perform their first concert in the United States, in New York City.
27 March – John Lennon and Paul McCartney are awarded the Ivor Novello award for "Michelle", the most performed song in Britain in 1966.
30 March – The Beatles pose with a photographic collage and wax figures from Madame Tussaud's famous museum for the cover artwork of Sgt. Pepper's Lonely Hearts Club Band album at Chelsea Manor Studios in London.
31 March – Kicking off a tour with The Walker Brothers, Cat Stevens and Engelbert Humperdinck at The Astoria London, Jimi Hendrix sets fire to his guitar on stage for the first time. He is taken to hospital suffering burns to his hands. The guitar-burning act would later become a trademark of Hendrix's performances.
8 April – The 12th Eurovision Song Contest is held in the Hofburg Imperial Palace, Vienna, Austria. The United Kingdom wins the contest for the first time with the Bill Martin/Phil Coulter song "Puppet on a String", sung by Sandie Shaw.
May – Paul McCartney reveals that all four members of The Beatles have "dropped acid". 
12 May – Pink Floyd stage the first ever rock concert with quadraphonic sound at Queen Elizabeth Hall, London
15 May – Paul McCartney meets American photographer Linda Eastman at a club called "Bag O' Nails".
19 May – Linda McCartney (née Eastman), photographs The Beatles at the London Press Party for Sgt. Pepper's Lonely Hearts Club Band held at the Belgravia home of Brian Epstein. Media there were perplexed by the band's fashion statements and the music itself.
May 30 – BBC Radio broadcasts "Where It's At" featuring The Beatles interviews, and John Lennon's comedy intro to Lucy in the Sky with Diamonds. BBC refuse to air A Day in the Life for alleged "drug references" in the lyrics.
1 June – Sgt. Pepper's Lonely Hearts Club Band by The Beatles is released in mono and stereo versions.
2 June – At the start of the 20th Aldeburgh Festival, Queen Elizabeth II opens the new Snape Maltings concert hall.
4 June – Jimi Hendrix Experience, Cream, Denny Laine and his Electric String Band, Procol Harum and The Chiffons, perform a two-hour "Sunday Special" at Saville Theatre in London.
25 June – The Beatles perform "All You Need Is Love" for the Our World television special, the first worldwide television broadcast. Backing singers include Eric Clapton and members of The Rolling Stones and The Who.
28 June – The Monkees fly into London at the start of their concerts at the Empire Pool, Wembley.
1 July – William Rees-Mogg, editor of The Times, uses the phrase "Who breaks a butterfly upon a wheel?" in his editorial criticizing the prison sentences given to Mick Jagger and Keith Richard two days earlier.
2 July – Jeff Beck and John Mayall & the Bluesbreakers perform a two-hour "Sunday Special" at Saville Theatre in London.
3 July – The Beatles host a party at the Speakeasy Club for The Monkees on the completion of their concerts in London.
18 July – The Jimi Hendrix Experience is thrown off a tour of The Monkees after complaints from the conservative Daughters of the American Revolution. (Hendrix's manager Chas Chandler later admits it was a publicity stunt.)
4 August – Pink Floyd release their debut album, The Piper at the Gates of Dawn.
14 August – The Marine Broadcasting Offences Act becomes law in the United Kingdom, and most offshore radio stations (including Wonderful Radio London) have already closed down. Only Radio Caroline North & South on 259 will continue, as Radio Caroline International.
23 August – Brian Epstein's last visit to a Beatles' recording session, at the Chappell Recording Studios on Maddox Street, London. The last new Beatles song he lives to hear was "Your Mother Should Know".
27 August – The Beatles, in Bangor, Wales, with the Maharishi Mahesh Yogi since 25 August, are informed of the death of their manager Brian Epstein, and they return to London at once.
31 August – Paul McCartney calls a band meeting to discuss his TV movie idea about a psychedelic bus ride.
7 September – Eric Burdon marries Angie King.
16 September – Sir Malcolm Sargent, having missed most of the Proms season through ill-health, is replaced as conductor of the Last Night of the Proms by Colin Davis, but appears on stage at the end of the concert.  Monica Sinclair is the guest soloist for "Rule, Britannia".  Sargent dies 17 days later.
30 September – The BBC replaces the Light Programme with two new radio stations: a pop music channel, Radio 1, and the more MOR-orientated Radio 2. The Third Programme is renamed Radio 3. Tony Blackburn launches Radio 1 by playing "Flowers in the Rain" by The Move.
December – George Harrison begins recording tracks for Wonderwall Music, his first solo album, in London; he continues the recording in Mumbai.
5 December – The Beatles open the Apple Boutique in London. Party guests include Eric Clapton and movie director Richard Lester.
15 December – The Who release their third studio album The Who Sell Out. It is a concept album, formatted as a collection of unrelated songs interspersed with faux commercials and public service announcements.
26 December – The first broadcast of The Beatles' TV special Magical Mystery Tour on BBC1. It is shown in black & white, upsetting the band because it does not show the intended psychedelic colour effects.

Charts
See UK No.1 Hits of 1967

Classical music

New works
Arwel Hughes – Mab y Dyn (cantata)
Jeffrey Lewis – Epitaphium – Children of the Sun
William Mathias – Sinfonietta

Opera
Richard Rodney Bennett – A Penny for a Song
Elizabeth Maconchy – The Three Strangers
William Walton – The Bear

Film and Incidental music
John Barry – You Only Live Twice, starring Sean Connery.
Richard Rodney Bennett –
Far from the Madding Crowd directed by John Schlesinger, starring Julie Christie, Alan Bates, Terence Stamp and Peter Finch.
Billion Dollar Brain directed by Ken Russell, starring Michael Caine.

Musical theatre
The Boy Friend (Sandy Wilson) – London revival opens at the Comedy Theatre on November 29, starring Cheryl Kennedy, and ran for 365 performances
The Four Musketeers, (Music: Laurie Johnson Lyrics: Herbert Kretzmer Book: Michael Pertwee). London production opened at the Drury Lane Theatre on December 5, starring Harry Secombe, and ran for 462 performances
Oliver! (Music, Lyrics & Book: Lionel Bart) – London revival opened at the Piccadilly Theatre on April 26 and ran for 331 performances

Musical films
Cuckoo Patrol, starring Freddie Garrity
Doctor Dolittle, starring Rex Harrison, Samantha Eggar and Anthony Newley.  
Half a Sixpence, starring Tommy Steele 
The Mini-Affair, starring Georgie Fame
Privilege, starring Paul Jones

Births
7 January – Mark Lamarr, DJ
15 February – Graham Jackson, conductor (died 2012)
11 March – John Barrowman, actor and singer
18 March
Miki Berenyi, lead singer of Lush
Jason John, singer (Big Fun)
6 April – Julian Anderson, composer and teacher
15 April – Frankie Poullain, bassist (The Darkness)
24 May – Deirdre Gribbin, composer
29 May – Noel Gallagher, singer-songwriter (Oasis)
3 June – Newton, singer-songwriter and producer
29 September - Brett Anderson, singer (Suede)
7 October – Luke Haines, singer-songwriter and keyboard player 
9 October - Mat Osman, bassist (Suede)
30 October – Gavin Rossdale, guitarist, singer and actor
3 November – Steven Wilson, guitarist and singer (Porcupine Tree)
7 November – Sharleen Spiteri, singer
12 November – Grant Nicholas, guitarist and singer (Feeder)
14 November – Letitia Dean, actress and singer
30 November – Rob Jeffrey, singer and guitarist (Let Loose)
19 December – Rebecca Saunders, composer
date unknown – Matthew King, pianist and composer

Deaths
3 January – Mary Garden, operatic soprano, 93
3 February – Joe Meek, record producer, 37 (suicide)
20 April – Denis Wright, composer and conductor of brass band music, 72
27 August – Brian Epstein, manager of The Beatles, 32 (suicide)
2 September – Philip Sainton, British–French composer, conductor and violist, 75
13 September – Herbert Langley, operatic baritone, 79
3 October – Malcolm Sargent, conductor, 72
13 November – Harriet Cohen, pianist, 71
18 November – Elise Stevenson, British-born US singer, 89

See also
 1967 in British radio
 1967 in British television
 1967 in the United Kingdom
 List of British films of 1967

References

 
British Music, 1967 In
British music by year